Alf Hulbækmo (born 17 March 1992) is a Norwegian award winning musician (piano, keyboards, harmonica, saxophone, and vocals) and composer, son of the traditional folk musicians Tone Hulbækmo and Hans Fredrik Jacobsen, and brother of drummer Hans Hulbækmo.

Discography 

 Siril & Alf
2017: Jeg Går Og Drømmer (Athletic Sound)

 Hulbækmo & Jacobsen Familieorkester
2017: På Snei (ta:lik)

References

External links 
Moskustrio official Website

21st-century Norwegian pianists
21st-century Norwegian saxophonists
Norwegian jazz pianists
Norwegian jazz saxophonists
Norwegian jazz composers
Male jazz composers
Musicians from Tolga, Norway
Norwegian University of Science and Technology alumni
1992 births
Living people
21st-century pianists
21st-century Norwegian male musicians